Gavin Hanrahan is a former professional rugby league footballer who played in the 1980s. He played for the Balmain Tigers from 1984–87 and he was part of the inaugural Newcastle Knights squad in 1988.

Playing career
Hanrahan made his first grade debut against North Sydney at Leichhardt Oval in Round 22 1984.  In 1988, Hanrahan joined Newcastle who had just been admitted into the competition.

Hanrahan played in the club's first ever game, a 28-4 loss against Parramatta.  Hanrahan's last game in first grade was a 32-20 loss against St George in Round 9 1988.

References

1965 births
Living people
Australian rugby league players
Newcastle Knights players
Balmain Tigers players
Rugby league centres
Place of birth missing (living people)